Akkerman Inc. is a construction equipment manufacturer producing microtunneling, guided boring, pipe jacking, and trenchless products.

Akkerman was founded in 1973, is based in Brownsdale, Minnesota, and  employed approximately 60.

Akkerman develops tunnel boring equipment that can excavate tunnels up to 14 feet in diameter.

References 

Trenchless technology
Subterranean excavating equipment companies